Tombesi is an Italian surname. Notable people with the surname include:

Alessio Tombesi (born 1982), Italian footballer
Giorgio Tombesi (1926–2023), Italian politician
Gurlino Tombesi ( c. 1492–1501), Italian condottiero

Italian-language surnames